Krishna Arjun is a detective show produced by Cinevistaas Limited and Contiloe Entertainment. The show aired on StarPlus which starred Shraddha Nigam and Hussain Kuwajerwala.

A pair of young detectives based in Mumbai take on cases that range from murder mysteries, kidnapping, thefts, missing cases to frauds.

Plot
Krishna and Arjun, a pair of detectives based in Mumbai take on cases that range from murder mysteries, kidnapping, thefts, missing cases to frauds. In their early twenties, this trendy duo have had many successful cases solved to their credit. Though based in Mumbai, their reputation has taken them to different parts of the country and even abroad. This dynamic duo, complement each other in solving unsolvable crimes.

Krishna is a modern young girl based in Mumbai. She is a busybee. She always has an unfulfilled 'To-Do' list and never has the time or the inclination to look at any guy. She is always looks forward to challenges and has an analytical bend of mind. Charged with the desire to put a wrong right, she is a young dynamic girl with a vision. Krishna is the brain behind the outfit. She collects little pieces of the puzzle in her photographic memory and deduces the answer of the entire puzzle in the end. She is not vain about her looks and though does not spend hours in front of the mirror, it is hard to ignore Krishna with her vivacious and bubbly looks coupled with a razor sharp brain. Arjun Complementing Krishna's sharp analytical skills is Arjun with practical skills that can get them out of any sticky situation. Ironically though, one word that would describe his disposition, is lazy. Not interested in doing any work at all, his dream is to laze on the beach for hours together, gawking at gorgeous girls. He is a harmless flirt, who actually steps back if any girl reciprocates to his harmless advances. Unknown to him, the only girl he is most comfortable with is Krishna. He loves to play practical jokes on everybody around him especially Krishna. Arjun is fashion conscious experimenting with new clothes and accessories.

Cast

Main
 Shraddha Nigam as Krishna 
 Hussain Kuwajerwala as Arjun

Recurring
 Aanjjan Srivastav as Krishna's father
 Ravi Baswani
 Neelu Kohli
 Sandeep Mehta
 Ronit Roy
 Shweta Kawatra

Production
Initially it was titled as Krishna Sharma C.A., and premiered on StarPlus on 18 March 2002 which followed is the story of Krishna Sharma played by Shraddha Nigam who is a cartoon artist which started as a comedy and then changed as kids series. However, when it did not get good response, the series undergone many changes including the script as a detective drama with the series being retitled Krishna Arjun with Nigam reprising her role with a new addition of Hussain Kuwajerwala as Arjun during July 2002, which was based on American drama Remington Steele.

Reception
The Tribune quoted the series as fast paced and stylised.

References

External links

StarPlus original programming